The Chinh phụ ngâm ("Lament of the soldier's wife", 征婦吟) is a poem in classical Chinese written by the Vietnamese author Đặng Trần Côn (1710-1745). It is also called the Chinh phụ ngâm khúc (征婦吟曲), with the additional -khúc ("tune", 曲) emphasizing that it can be performed as a musical piece not just read as a plain "lament" (ngâm, 吟). 

The Chinese-language poem was translated into vernacular chữ Nôm by several translators including Phan Huy Ích and Đoàn Thị Điểm. It was also translated into Japanese, English, French and Korean languages. The first eight lines of the poem along with the music composed by Professor Võ Văn Lúa were adopted as the national anthem of the Autonomous Republic of Cochinchina from 1946 to 1949.

References

Vietnamese poems
Lê dynasty literature
Chinese-language literature of Vietnam
Works about wars